Angélique Charbonnée (c.1740 – after 1780) was a French engraver.

Very little is known of her life but Charbonnée is known from her engravings after old masters. One of which she signed A. Charbonnée sculp. She is known for her engravings after David Teniers the Younger.

References 

1740 births
1780 deaths
French engravers
18th-century French women artists
Women engravers
French women printmakers